BC Cherkaski Mavpy (which  means "Cherkasy Apes") is a Ukrainian professional basketball club that plays its home games in Cherkasy.

In the 2007 NBA Draft, Cherkaski Mavpy center Kyrylo Fesenko was selected 38th by the Philadelphia 76ers, who then traded his rights to the Utah Jazz. In 2017, Cherkasi played at the Houssam el Din Hariri Tournament, and finished as finalist after losing to Riyadi Beirut. In 2018, Cherkasi won its first SuperLeague championship.

Honours
Ukrainian Basketball SuperLeague
Champions (1): 2017–18

Season by season

European record

Notes

Players

Current squad

Notable players

 Fadi El Khatib
 Kyrylo Fesenko 1 season: 2006–07
 Tomas Delininkaitis 1 season: 2012–13
 Sviatoslav Mykhailiuk 2012–14

See also
 FC Cherkashchyna

External links
 Official website 
 Eurobasket.com Cherkaski Mavpy Page

Basketball teams in Ukraine
Sport in Cherkasy
Basketball teams established in 2003
2003 establishments in Ukraine